This is a list of the National Register of Historic Places listings in Jasper County, Iowa.

This is intended to be a complete list of the properties and districts on the National Register of Historic Places in Jasper County, Iowa, United States. Latitude and longitude coordinates are provided for many National Register properties and districts; these locations may be seen together in a map.

There are 16 properties and districts listed on the National Register in the county.

|}

See also

 List of National Historic Landmarks in Iowa
 National Register of Historic Places listings in Iowa
 Listings in neighboring counties: Mahaska, Marion, Marshall, Polk, Poweshiek, Story

References

Jasper

Buildings and structures in Jasper County, Iowa